Holdsworth is a surname. Notable people with the surname include:

Holdsworth (Yorkshire cricketer), 19th century English cricketer
Alan Holdsworth (born 1952), English musician and disability activist
Allan Holdsworth (1946–2017), English guitarist and composer
Andy Holdsworth (born 1984), English footballer
Annie E. Holdsworth, English writer
Arthur Howe Holdsworth (1780–1860), English merchant and politician
B. G. Holdsworth (1892–1949), Indian civil servant
Barbara Clarke Holdsworth (1929–1912), British author
Bronwen Holdsworth (born 1943), New Zealand businesswoman
Chris Holdsworth (born 1987), American mixed martial artist
Dan Holdsworth (born 1974), British photographer
Daniel Holdsworth (disambiguation), multiple people
David Holdsworth (born 1968), English footballer and manager
Dean Holdsworth (born 1968), English footballer and manager
Edward Holdsworth (1684–1746), English classical scholar
Edward Holdsworth Sugden (1854–1935), British Methodist minister
Ethel Carnie Holdsworth (1886–1962), English writer
Frank Holdsworth (1872–1941), New Zealand cricketer
Frank Wild Holdsworth (1904–1969), British orthopaedic surgeon
Fred Holdsworth (born 1952), American baseball player
Gary Holdsworth (born 1941), Australian sprinter
Harry Holdsworth Rawson (1843–1910), British admiral
Herbert Holdsworth (1890–1949), British politician and businessman
James B. Holdsworth (c. 1796 – 1859), Canadian merchant and politician
Jeff Holdsworth (born 1963), American musician
Jim Holdsworth (1850–1918), American baseball player
John Holdsworth (referee), English rugby league referee
John Holdsworth (priest) (born 1949), Welsh priest
John Holdsworth (rugby union) (1884–?), Australian rugby union player
Joseph Holdsworth (1789–1857), British politician
Karen Holdsworth (1960–2013), British marathon runner
Kelvin Holdsworth (born 1966), Scottish Episcopalian clergyman
Lee Holdsworth (born 1983), Australian racing driver
Leslie Holdsworth Allen (1879–1964), Australian academic and poet
Michaela Denis, née Holdsworth (1914–2002), British filmmaker
Paul Holdsworth (born 1970), Australian rules footballer
Petrina Holdsworth (born 1952), English politician
Philip Holdsworth (1851–1902), Australian poet and public servant
R. L. Holdsworth (1899–1976), British academic and explorer
Richard Holdsworth (1590–1649), English academic theologian
Herbert Holdsworth Ross (1908–1978), British-Canadian entomologist
Samantha Holdsworth, New Zealand medical physicist
Ted Holdsworth (born 1984), Australian rules footballer
Thomas Holdsworth Blake (1792–1849), American politician
Trevor Holdsworth (1927–2010), English businessman
Victoria Holdsworth (born 1944), English philanthropist
Wayne Holdsworth (born 1968), Australian cricketer
William Holdsworth (disambiguation), multiple people

English-language surnames
English toponymic surnames